The Razzie Redeemer Award is an award presented at the annual Golden Raspberry Awards (also known as the Razzies) to a past Razzie Award nominee or winner who becomes "a respected artist" and comes back from critical or commercial failure.

History
Billed as “the Razzie you want to win”, it is the only award issued by the Golden Raspberry Award Foundation that can be considered a genuine honor. It was introduced in 2014.

The following is a list of nominees and recipients of that award, along with the films for which they were nominated.

Winners and nominees

2010s

2020s

Multiple nominations
Will Smith – 3
Keanu Reeves – 2

References

External links
 Official Razzie website

Redeemer
Awards established in 2014
Most improved awards
2014 establishments in the United States